Cosmariomyia pallidipennis is a species of soldier fly in the family Stratiomyidae.

Distribution
Canada, United States, Mexico

References

Stratiomyidae
Insects described in 1901
Insects of Canada
Taxa named by Samuel Wendell Williston
Diptera of North America